EVB may refer to:

 Eisenbahnen und Verkehrsbetriebe Elbe-Weser, a German rail and bus company
 Eleanor Vere Boyle (1825–1916), Scottish artist
 Electric-vehicle battery
 Embedded Visual Basic
 Empirical valence bond
 Evaluation board
 New Smyrna Beach Municipal Airport in Florida, United States
 Public Eye (organization), a Swiss sustainability organization